is a Japanese action manga series written by Izo Hashimoto and illustrated by Akio Tanaka. It was first serialized in Futabasha's Weekly Manga Action in 1998 and moved to Evening in 2004. It was discontinued in 2007 due to creative differences but returned in 2011 and ended in 2015. It tells a story of a boy who killed his parents and turned himself into a cold-blooded martial artist. The manga inspired a Hong Kong film adaptation that was released in 2007.

Background
Shamo differs significantly from other seinen manga in that the story's protagonist is actually an unrepentant and often unsympathetic criminal. Throughout the manga Ryo Narushima is depicted as being unrepentant for the murder of his parents (who are later implied to have been physically abusive  towards Ryo and overly controlling of his life) and is shown committing crimes such as assault and rape for the sake of making himself stronger. Though capable of redemption (as evidenced by his care-taking of his sister and various small charitable acts shown throughout the manga) ultimately Narushima is a Byronic hero spiraling into darkness, his chances at reform slowly ebbing away as he gives in to more and more of his depraved and brutal tendencies. However, Ryo seems to genuinely care for those close to him, and will not hesitate to help them if they are in trouble. He is also shown to have fallen in love with Yan, the granddaughter of the master he studied under while he lived in China and was crushed by her suicide, which made him hellbent on killing the man who drove her to it.

A minor theme throughout the manga is society's morally based stratification, how it condemns young criminals like Narushima, and how that condemnation forces Narushima to the fringes of society making his chances of true reform and redemption even more remote.

Various supporting characters within Shamo act as dramatic foils to Narushima, with Naoto Sugawara being the primary example of this. Famous, rich, and beloved for the same abilities that make Narushima a social pariah, Sugawara's presence can be seen as an example of society's cognitive dissonance towards violence. Narushima is reviled for his violent traits, while Sugawara is praised & rewarded for using those same traits in a slightly different context. This is part of the recurring theme of "traditional vs. modern karate" in which Ryo (who uses traditional karate meant for combat and self-defense) and the various elder members of Banryukai find themselves hopelessly lost in a world where such karate is scorned in favor of modern sport karate, to the point where Resshin, the man who founded Banryukai along with his late brother, contemplates suicide due to his despair at living in a country of "declawed men" where the style he and his brother used to survive the Second World War has been hopelessly defiled by modern ideals.

This story was inspired by the Kobe child murders of 1997 that a 14-year-old "Boy A" ("Shōnen A") killed and decapitated several children.

Ryo Narushima is modeled after two persons:
 Juvenile delinquency part: The "Boy A".
 Martial art part:  of Kyokushin. This Karate fighter's name has same pronunciation as the main character's name.

Synopsis

Part 1: The reformatory
, a talented highschooler who was about to enter Tokyo University, the most prestigious university in Japan, killed his parents before his successful life could begin. The perfect family and perfect life seemed to devour the young boy's restless soul. In a beautiful sunny afternoon when cicadas were singing, he stabbed his father and mother to death with a short knife repeatedly before he came to his senses.

The 16-year-old bookworm murderer was convicted and sent to a reformatory where he was gang raped by other boys. , a jailed man who nearly assassinated the Japanese Prime Minister decades ago, was sent to the reformatory to teach the youngsters karate every week. He discovered Ryo's talent and taught him self-defense. Ryo survived and thanks to a law that protects minors, was released two years later, but not before beating several would-be attackers with such savagery that his previous tormentors became terrified of him. He also engaged Kurokawa in a sparring match as a final test of his skills. Ryo returns to society with the mindset of gaining strength so as to survive and never be a victim again.

Alone in a city full of crime, he tried to look for his lost sister but ends up mistaking a drug-abusing prostitute for her. Ryo started to fight for his living and used all imaginable dirty tricks to defeat his enemies. He also ambushed gangsters in dark alleys to perfect his fighting skill as well as working as a gigolo. He later enters into a Banryukai karate tournament and spends time training his reflexes by kidnapping a woman and forcing her to attempt to kill him, releasing her after he successfully sensed her killing intent. He wins the tournament by blackmailing his opponents anonymously and throwing them off their game with his knowledge of their dirtiest secrets (e.g. an opponent whose wife is openly unfaithful). He wins in his weight class despite objections from the crowd and his fellow contestants over his vicious fighting style, but his victory is legitimized by Mochizuki himself, who claims that Ryo's fighting is still superior regardless of the context.

Part 2: Sugawara
In this part, Ryo fights  of the  twice. Banryukai is possibly modeled after the Kyokushin kaikan and Seidokaikan and Mochizuki is possibly modeled after Kazuyoshi Ishii, the founder of Seidokaikan.

Believing that he is the strongest, the "gamecock" starts to take on other good martial artists. A blood-thirsty TV producer notices that this street-fighting young man was the "Youth A" and pushes to have him join "Lethal Fight," a fictional combat arena modeled after Japan's K-1 tournament. Ryo, a dangerous man with an animal instinct who destroyed many good fighters in the ring, one day finds himself facing Thailand's best fighter who was fighting to support his family. Before he is totally defeated, he tries to kick the Thai fighter's neck but the fighter ducks and is hit in the eye and blinded.

Ryo wants to take on Sugawara. However, Sugawara is much taller and heavier than Ryo, so his chance to fight him was remote. As a way to provide incentive, Ryo raped Sugawara's supermodel girlfriend. Sugawara vowed to kill Ryo with his hands in the boxing ring to comfort his woman and agreed to a televised fight at the Tokyo Dome. It was the duel between darkness and brightness. Only this time, Ryo (亮), literally "brightness," stands for the dark side.

Ryo goes through a painful bodybuilding regime where he used steroids to increase his muscle mass and strength. Before the fight began, his left eye became bloody under the non-human torture. He did not care. Bad luck was on Ryo's side. His small body still was no comparison to Sugawara's. However, he rediscovered his long-forgotten left-handedness suppressed by his parents since he was a child minutes before the end of the last round. Then he wildly gave Sugawara countless heavy left punches before Sugawara used his broken right fist to punch him out of consciousness. He survives the lethal fight and was defeated only five seconds before the fight was over. Sugawara fails to kill him in front of the crowd.

Out of anger and frustration, Sugawara invites Ryo to another private fight three months later in an abandoned temple. Sugawara takes several darts and a long wooden stick. Ryo takes a pair of tonfa with him. After a long and brutal duel where Narushima is almost killed, Sugawara is hit in the back of the neck and was hospitalized.

Part 3 : The ballet dancer 
It tells a story that Toma Takahara (高原 東馬 Takahara Tōma), a successful male ballet dancer with a savior complex, mysteriously abandoned his dancing career to pursue martial arts. It is revealed that the reason is because, after witnessing Ryo's fight with Sugawara, he became obsessed with Ryo and desired to 'save' him like he has others before. The new volumes (20, 21) pick up with Ryo fighting in a club in Japan. Ryo discovers after one fight that his ability has dropped significantly (implied to be due to the experimental steroids he had taken before) and he decides to start training hard. Ryo enters a Banryukai karate competition in a mask and after losing in the finals by disqualification, is spotted by Mochizuki. Mochizuki offers him money to enter a grappling tournament fighting against Toma. Ryo, desperate for money, accepts and begins training with the master of the man he lost to in the finals (who has since returned to being a hikkikomori). Before the tournament, he visits the comatose Sugawara in the hospital and, after Ryo emotionally implores his rival to wake up, Sugawara hears Ryo's voice and comes out of his coma. Ryo is placed on Team Banryukai, made up of himself and the four Black Dogi (Banryukai masters wearing black gi) and Team Toma is made up of Toma and four masters of various styles ranging from well known to esoteric. Ryo also discovers that Kurokawa was the one who trained Toma, as he now desires to undo what he had done by turning Ryo down the path of violence. This revelation only spurs Ryo on, as he becomes determined to defeat his master, who was now a part of the same society he had taught Ryo to hate and war against. The first four fights end with two no-contests, two wins by team Toma and one win for the Banryukai. While waiting for his turn to fight, Ryo was stabbed by Moemi Funato. However, he still plans to fight.

Ryo and Toma start fighting with Toma at a heavy advantage. However, before he can win a sudden thunderstorm floods the stage. adapting more quickly to this new field Ryo turns the tables and begins using mind games to overwhelm the more naive Toma. Having so far fought calmly Toma becomes enraged and afraid further playing into Ryo's hands. As Ryo begins to gain more and more of an advantage, he begins to realize that Toma isn't actually a good person, but rather had just never encountered someone who was truly evil or in need of actual salvation. The damage from the stab wound was too much however and Toma manages to win thanks to Ryo fainting from blood loss, but he is mentally crippled by Ryo's nightmarish fighting style and the hallucinations he had during the fight.

During the aftermath of the fight Mochizuki is replaced as chairman and the Banryukai is split into two factions (True and New Banryukai) and officially breaks all ties with Lethal Fight, pinning all of the more sordid things Banryukai members did under the label on Mochizuki. After a night of drinking Mochizuki is mugged and killed. Ryo finds out that Kurokawa and his ringside doctor have both died during the night. Ryo begins living with his sister and her caretaker.

Part 4 : 2 Foolish Brothers 

Ryo begins dating a girl. Her father doesn't approve. He hires 2 hit men to deal with Ryo and get his daughter back despite the fact she is there of her own free will. After a confrontation at his house Ryo agrees to fight the younger brother. While Ryo wins he is mortally wounded and later dies from his wounds, in the forest. Rags of his crow shirt can be seen in the last pages, suggesting an alternative end.

Film
Shamo was made into a Hong Kong film in 2007. It was directed by Cheang Pou-soi and starred Shawn Yue.

Court case
The manga, written by Izo Hashimoto and illustrated by Akio Tanaka, was first serialized in 1998 in Manga Action. It moved to Evening and was put on hold in 2007 due in part to creative differences. Shamo manga artist Akio Tanaka was in a legal battle against Shamo's credited creator, Izô Hashimoto, for 150 million yen (about US$1.4 million) in a copyright lawsuit that opened in June 2008 in the Tokyo District Court. Tanaka claimed that he, and not Hashimoto, had created the story and the character concepts. On July 18, 2011, Tanaka announced on his homepage that Shamo would return to the pages of Evening magazine on July 27, 2011, and the title would start to be reprinted in wide editions. The serialization of the series concluded on January 13, 2015.

Volume list

Notes

External links

 

1998 manga
Crime in anime and manga
Futabasha manga
Kodansha manga
Martial arts anime and manga
Seinen manga
Thriller anime and manga